Highlight is a South Korean boy band formerly known as Beast (Korean: 비스트). The band consists of four members: Yoon Doo-joon, Yang Yo-seob, Lee Gi-kwang, and Son Dong-woon. Originally a six-piece band, Jang Hyun-seung departed from the group in April 2016, and Yong Jun-hyung departed in March 2019. In late 2016, the group moved labels from Cube Entertainment to Around Us Entertainment and subsequently changed their name to Highlight in 2017.

The group debuted in 2009 with the EP Beast Is the B2ST. In 2011, they released their first full-length album, Fiction and Fact, and made their Japanese debut with the single, "Shock". As Beast, the group released three Korean full-length albums, nine Korean extended plays, two Japanese full-length albums, and numerous singles. The group re-debuted as Highlight in 2017 with the EP Can You Feel It?. They have since released three more EPs as Highlight.

Beast initially received attention for the lack of industry success previously experienced by its members, with media outlets referring to them as a "recycled group". However, the group has achieved significant commercial success and critical accolades and is one of the most awarded groups of all time at the Golden Disc Awards, the Seoul Music Awards, and the Melon Music Awards.

History

2009: Pre-debut documentary and Beast Is the B2ST
In August 2009, Cube Entertainment publicly introduced its new boy group B2ST (an abbreviation for "Boys To Search for Top") on the TV documentary series MTV B2ST. The group consisted of Yoon Doo-joon, who previously competed on another series to be member of 2PM or 2AM; Jang Hyun-seung, who had competed on a series to be a member of Big Bang; Lee Gi-kwang, who previously debuted as a solo artist under the name AJ; Yang Yo-seob; Yong Jun-hyung; and Son Dong-woon.

After changing their name from B2ST to Beast, the group debuted on October 15, 2009 with the extended play Beast Is the B2ST. They began promotions that day for the album and its lead single, "Bad Girl", by holding a live showcase and performing on KBS Music Bank. The EP sold over 10,000 copes in its first week of release and went on to sell 40,000 copies by early 2010, an unusual feat for a Korean rookie group at the time. 

In December, Beast won the Rookie of the Month award from South Korea's Ministry of Culture, Sports and Tourism. The group's second single, "Mystery", garnered them an award for Rookie of the Month at the Cyworld Digital Music Awards that December. Beast also won Best New Artist at the 19th Seoul Music Awards in February 2010.

2010: Shock of the New Era, Mastermind, Lights Go On Again and My Story 
Beast released their second EP, Shock of the New Era, on March 1, 2010. Later that month, the group achieved their first music show number-one win on Mnet’s M Countdown with the album's lead single "Shock". Beast released a music video for the album's second single, "Take Care of My Girlfriend (Say No)", in April. Shock of the New Era quickly sold 20,000 copies in South Korea, ultimately selling nearly 60,000 copies by the end of the year. In August, Beast received the Golden Disk Award from their international label, Universal Music, in recognition of the group's album sales in Singapore, Malaysia, and Taiwan.On September 28, Beast released their third EP, Mastermind. One week later, the group claimed first place on KBS Music Bank with the album's lead single, "Breath". In October, Beast received the Asia Influential Artist Award at the 2010 Asia Song Festival. The group followed up this success with their fourth EP, Lights Go On Again, released on November 9. The album, which includes the single "Beautiful", was the group's first to reach the number-one spot on the Gaon Album Chart. Cumulative sales of Shock of the New Era, Mastermind and Lights Go On Again exceeded 107,000 copies by mid-December, making Beast the only South Korean rookie group to sell over 100,000 albums in 2010.
On December 9, Beast was awarded Best New Artist at the 25th Golden Disc Awards. Three days later, they held their first solo concert, "Welcome to Beast Airline", at the Jamsil Indoor Stadium in Seoul to an audience of 10,000. At the concert, the group debuted three duets that they subsequently released online starting on December 21 as part of the digital EP, My Story.

2011: Japanese debut and Fiction and Fact 
Beast released their first Japanese single, a Japanese version of "Shock", on March 16, 2011. The song sold 29,000 copies in one week and debuted at number two on the daily Oricon Singles Chart, the highest-ranking debut by a foreign artist at the time. 

On May 17, Beast released their first full-length Korean album, Fiction and Fact. The album peaked at number one on the Gaon Album Chart and sold over 142,000 copies by the end of the year. Its singles, "On Rainy Days" and "Fiction" were also commercially successful, selling 2.8 million and 2.6 million copies, respectively, by the end of the year. The album garnered Beast wins for Artist of the Year for the 2nd Quarter at the 2011 Gaon Chart Music Awards and a Bonsang at the 2012 Golden Disc Awards. "Fiction" won Song of the Year at the 2011 KBS Music Festival, and Best Male Dance Performance at the 2011 Mnet Asian Music Awards.

On August 10, the group released their first Japanese album, So Beast, which includes Japanese versions of "Shock" and "Bad Girl" as singles. The album debuted in the number-two spot on the daily Oricon Albums Chart, selling over 26,000 copies in its first day of release.

In November, Beast was awarded the grand prize of Artist of the Year at the 3rd Melon Music Awards, as well as a commendation from South Korea's Minister of Culture at the 2011 Korean Popular Culture and Arts Awards for the group's contributions to pop culture and the spread of the Korean wave abroad. In early 2012, the group was awarded Best New Artist at the 26th Japan Gold Disc Awards in recognition of the commercial success of their Japanese releases.

2012–2013: Beautiful Show, Midnight Sun and Hard to Love, How to Love 
Beast embarked on their "Beautiful Show" international tour in February 2012, in which the group performed in cities throughout Asia, Europe, and North America. Mid-tour, the group released a self-filmed music video for their 2009 single "Mystery", which subsequently charted at number one on YinYueTai, a major Chinese music video sharing website. 

On July 21, Beast released their fifth extended play, Midnight Sun, which includes the singles "I Knew It", "Midnight" and "Beautiful Night". The album was written, in large part, by group member Yong Jun-hyung. It debuted at number one on the Gaon Album Chart and marked Beast's first appearance on the Billboard World Albums Chart, peaking at number 15. The album sold over 140,000 copies by the end of the year and garnered the group a Bonsang award at the 27th Golden Disc Awards. In November, Beast won their second consecutive award for Artist of the Year at the 4th Melon Music Awards.

On July 19, 2013, Beast released their second full-length Korean album, Hard to Love, How to Love, which was composed by Yong Jun-hyung and his writing partner Kim Tae-joo. The album includes the ballad, "Will You Be Okay?", which was released a month prior and charted at number one on both the Gaon Digital Chart and Billboard's K-Pop Hot 100. The album won the group Bonsang awards at the 28th Golden Disc Awards, 5th Melon Music Awards and 23rd Seoul Music Awards, while the album's lead single, "Shadow", won Best Music Video at the Melon Music Awards.

2014–2015: Good Luck, Time and Ordinary
On June 16, 2014, Beast released their sixth extended play, Good Luck. The album debuted at number one on the Gaon Album Chart, while its singles, "No More" and "Good Luck", both reached the number-one spot on the Gaon Digital Chart. "Good Luck" was also a critical success, named the best k-pop song of the year by Billboard and ranked number two for the year by Dazed. 

The group released their seventh EP, Time, on October 20, 2014 to mark their fifth anniversary since debuting.

They released their eighth mini-album Ordinary on July 27, 2015.

2016: Guess Who?, Hyun-seung's departure, Highlight and new label

On April 19, 2016, Cube Entertainment released a statement confirming Jang Hyun-seung's departure from the group. The band continued as a five-member group and Hyun-seung proceeded under Cube as a solo artist. The reason for his departure was due to differences in music styles between him and the other members.

On June 21, Beast announced the upcoming release of their third full-length album, Highlight. The album was released on July 3, with the pre-release track, Butterfly, released on June 26, and Ribbon as their title tracks. This marked their first comeback as a group of five.

On December 15, 2016, Beast officially announced the launch of their new label Around Us Entertainment, subsequently leaving their label of seven years, Cube Entertainment. As the Beast name is trademarked by Cube, Beast was unable to promote under the name legally.

2017: Rebranding as Highlight, Can You Feel It?, Calling You, and Celebrate

On February 24, 2017, Around Us Entertainment announced that the members would continue as a group together, now under the name of "Highlight".

On March 2, 2017, it was announced that Highlight would officially debut on March 20, 2017 with their mini-album Can You Feel It?.

On April 9, 2017, Highlight announced that they would be holding their first concert tour as Highlight and release a repackaged album Calling You on May 29.

On October 16, 2017, Highlight released their second EP, Celebrate, in the celebration of their eighth anniversary.

2018–2020: Military enlistment, Outro, and Jun-hyung's departure 
On August 24, 2018, Doo-joon enlisted for mandatory military service. He was discharged on April 10, 2020.

It was announced that Highlight's special album, Outro, will be released on November 20, 2018, being promoted with 4 members.

On January 24, 2019, Yo-seob began his mandatory military service as a conscripted police officer. On August 30, 2020, he was discharged from the military.

On March 13, 2019, Junhyung announced his departure from Highlight after he admitted to watching illegal videos sent to him by singer Jung Joon-young, who is under investigation for secretly filming women during sex.

On April 18, 2019, Gi-kwang began his mandatory military service as a conscripted police officer.  On November 17, 2020, he was discharged from the military.

On May 9, 2019, Dong-woon began his mandatory military service as a conscripted policeman. On December 7, 2020, he was discharged from the military, marking the end of Highlight's military enlistment.

2021–present: The Blowing, Daydream, and After Sunset 
Following a two-and-a-half year hiatus, Highlight made their first comeback as a four-member group on May 3, 2021 with their third EP, The Blowing.

On March 21, 2022, Highlight released their fourth studio album, Daydream. After the promotions for Daydream ended, it was announced that Highlight would be holding a three-day concert, INTRO, at Jamsil Indoor Gymnasium from March 20–22. This would mark their first concert as a group in over 3 years, following the COVID-19 outbreak, their military enlistment, and the OUTRO concert in November 2018, where Doo-joon was absent.  Tickets were sold out within three days. 

The group hosted a fan concert titled Highlight Sports Day on October 15–16. On the second day, Highlight announced their comeback by playing a short clip during the concert end credits. The clip featured Lee singing, "Because I'm alone, I'm alone without you," paired with their comeback date.  Their 4th EP, After Sunset, was released on November 7, 2022.

Discography

As Beast

Korean albums
 Fiction and Fact (2011)
 Hard to Love, How to Love (2013)
 Highlight (2016)

Japanese albums
 So Beast (2011)
 Guess Who? (2016)

As Highlight
Korean albums
 Daydream (2022)

Filmography

Reality shows 
 MTV B2ST (2009)
 MTV B2ST Almighty (2010)
 Idol Maid (2010) 
 Burning the Beast (2014)
 Music-Slip Show "As We Say" (2017)
 Ready Player: HIGHLIGHT (2018)
 Super Seller (2021) 
Beast was the topic of a short-lived reality show, MTV B2ST, which was hosted by MTV. The show ran on a weekly basis from August 23 – October 9, 2009, with a total of ten episodes. The program showcased their journey leading up to their debut. It was announced in March 2010 that Beast will be hosting a second season of MTV B2ST entitled MTV Beast Almighty. After last year's broadcast debut, season 2 had fans and viewers' wishes as the concept of the program where the members will have to pick out one wish to grant for every episode. The show ran on a weekly basis from April 10 – May 29, 2010.

Beast became the protagonists of the variety show Idol Maid running on a weekly basis from July 21 – October 13, 2010. The group also had a cameo on the sitcom More Charming by the Day.

Beast was selected as a PR envoy to promote the audition program Global Super Idol, which aired in November, 2011. They also attended the preliminaries in Korea, Thailand, and China to encourage the contestants and give advice. Global Super Idol is a global audition program that pits finalists from Thailand and China against finalists in Korea. All the finalists will attend the main show in Korea. Since Beast is very popular in Asian countries, including Thailand, Japan, and China, their popularity helped the show become popular too by performing their songs for fans and contestants from all over the world.

Beast was a part of 12-episode reality show, Showtime: Burning the Beast, in 2014. It was their first reality show in 4 years, which featured them getting to know each other better through missions.

Other activities
On December 3, 2010, Beast attended the Patricia Field Collection fashion show located in Seoul Cheongdamdong MCM Haus and was praised by Patricia Field herself for their “distinctive and modern look”. For this collection, MCM’s Heritage and Patricia Field worked together to show off a modern New Yorker style with a trendy shopper bag, backpack, clutch, and more items and any money earned from it will be donated to the ‘Korea Disaster Relief’ to benefit the civilians left homeless from the Yeonpyeong incident.

In April 2012, Beast collaborated with Jim Rickey to make their own sneaker brand, Beast X Jim Rickey. Beast members were directly involved in the design of these shoes and they are available in 6 different colours.

Concerts and tours

Concerts 
 Welcome to Beast Airline - Seoul Olympic Stadium, Seoul (December 12, 2010)
 Welcome Back to Beast Airlines- Seoul Olympic Stadium, Seoul (February 18–19, 2011)
 Beautiful Show 2013 - Olympic Gymnastics Arena, Seoul (July 20–21, 2013)
 Beautiful Show 2014 - Olympic Gymnastics Arena, Seoul (August 16–17, 2014)
Beautiful Show in Hong Kong - AsiaWorld–Expo, Hong Kong (May 30, 2015)
Beautiful Show in Taiwan - Tianmu Stadium, Taipei (June 6, 2015)
 Beautiful Show 2015 - Olympic Gymnastics Arena, Seoul (August 29–30, 2015)
 Beautiful Show 2016 - Olympic Gymnastics Arena, Seoul (August 20–21, 2016)
Celebrate Live 2017 - Jamsil Arena, Seoul (December 21–23, 2017)
Celebrate Live 2018 - Taipei Nangang Exhibition Center, Taipei (March 11, 2018)
OUTRO Live 2018 - Olympic Gymnastics Arena, Seoul (November 24–25, 2018)
INTRO Live 2022 - Jamsil Arena, Seoul (May 20–22, 2022)
INTRO Live in Japan 2022 - Tokyo Dome City Hall, Tokyo (September 18–19, 2022)

Tours 
 Beautiful Show - Seoul, Berlin, Shanghai, Singapore, Jakarta, Yokohama, Kobe, Nagoya, Taipei, and Bangkok (February 4 to May 27, 2012)
We Zepp Tour 2012  - Sapporo, Osaka, Hiroshima, Nagoya, Fukuoka, and Tokyo (October 12–30, 2012)
 Japan Tour 2014 - Ichihara, Nagoya, Fukuoka, Tokyo, Osaka, and Hiroshima (January 31 to April 3, 2014) 
 Japan Tour 2015 - Ichihara, Sapporo, Niigata, Nagoya, Tokyo, Fukuoka, Hiroshima, and Kobe (October 30 to November 29, 2015)
Beautiful Show in China 2015-2016 - Shanghai, Guangzhou, Beijing, Chengdu (December 6, 2015 to 2016)
 Guess Who? Tour 2016 - Ichihara, Niigata, Nagoya, Fukuoka, Nagasaki, Saitama, Tokyo, Sapporo, Osaka, and Hiroshima (June 3 to July 2, 2016)

 Can You Feel It? Live 2017 - Seoul, Busan, Gwangju, Hong Kong and Taipei (June 2 to September 16, 2017)

 Can You Feel It? Live in Japan 2017 - Osaka, Nagoya and Tokyo (August 20–24, 2017)

Awards

References

External links
Around US Entertainment Official Website

Cube Entertainment artists
Universal Music Japan artists
K-pop music groups
Musical groups established in 2009
South Korean boy bands
South Korean dance music groups
 
MAMA Award winners
Melon Music Award winners